When Desert County, Utah Territory was created March 3, 1852 it extended into present-day Nevada from the shore of the Great Salt Lake on the east to the western edge of the Great Basin in California between Weber and Tooele counties in Utah Territory.

On January 5, 1856 Desert County was reduced significantly, and former Desert County land in present-day Nevada was used to form part of three new Utah Territory counties: Carson, Humboldt, and Saint Mary's. Desert County was extinguished on January 17, 1862 and her remaining land was split between Box Elder and Tooele counties.

For records of Desert County in what is present-day Nevada, see:

Nevada State Archives. 
Utah State Archives may have a few records from the Utah Territory Desert County courts and deeds.

Some records for old Desert County, Utah Territory may have been transferred to, or may have been re-recorded in the new counties formed from the old Desert County. See also:

Carson County, Utah Territory 
Humboldt County, Utah Territory (not to be confused with Humboldt County, Nevada)
Saint Mary's County, Utah Territory

For records of Desert County in what is present-day Utah, see:

Box Elder County, Utah 
Tooele County, Utah

References 

Former counties of Utah
Geography of Box Elder County, Utah
Geography of Tooele County, Utah